The Islamic Museum of Tripoli is a proposed museum of Islamic culture that was built under the support and patronage of Saif al-Islam Gaddafi in Tripoli, Libya.

Location
The museum's building-reuse project stands in the al Sur area, in Shari' Sidi Khaliffa, Tripoli.

2011 Libyan civil war
In May 2011 it was reported that construction on – and acquisitions for – had been halted; the museum was scheduled to open in September 2011 to celebrate the anniversary of Muammar Gaddafi's rise to power. It was due to be housed in a summer palace built for the Ottoman Yusuf Pasha in the 18th century.

The results of the Battle of Tripoli in August 2011, with the later arrest of Saif al-Islam Gaddafi, may alter the museum's opening date and festivities. Hafed Walda, Cultural Counsellor of the regime, confirmed that the project was on hold and that the future of the collection was not ensured. Meanwhile, no attempts of looting the collection were reported, though the seeming patron-less future of the collection was uncertain.

See also 

 List of museums of Islamic art
 List of museums in Libya
 Red Castle Museum

References

External links
 islamit.45.com  (in Arabic), museum's official website
 YouTube video - Restoration of the Islamic Museum in Tripoli by Studio Italia Costruzioni

Art museums and galleries in Libya
Unfinished buildings and structures
Islamic organizations based in Libya
Islamic museums
Museums in Tripoli, Libya